Krai Setthaphon known professionally as Kaewfah Tor Buamas (แก้วฟ้า ต.บัวมาศ) is a Thai professional boxer.

Biography & career
Tor Buamas was born in Roi Et province before moving to live and grow in Nakhon Sawan province. He started boxing since childhood because of poverty by his uncle was the first trainer with a first salary about 80–100 baht. Later, he became an amateur boxer in several tournaments and success in the youth level before turning pro in 2009.

In the middle of the year 2017, he entered the master's degree at the Faculty of Business Administration, Rajamangala University of Technology Phra Nakhon.

On 19 May 2018, he challenged interim Asian Boxing Council (ABCO) Super lightweight title against younger fellow-countryman Atchariya Wirojanasunobol, a former Thailand national amateur boxing squad at Workpoint Studio, Pathum Thani province. He is defeated after the 10th round with split decision via scored 95–95, 97–93 and 97–93.

Titles
Regional titles:
Asian Boxing Council (ABCO) 
Featherweight title (126 lbs) (2011)
Super featherweight interim title (130 lbs) (2013)
Lightweight title (135 lbs) (2015)
WBA Asia 
Super featherweight  title (130 lbs) (2017)

Professional boxing record

References

External links
 

Kaewfah Tor Buamas
Kaewfah Tor Buamas
1986 births
Living people
Kaewfah Tor Buamas
Featherweight boxers
Super-featherweight boxers
Lightweight boxers
Light-welterweight boxers